Atanasie Anghel Popa (died 19 August 1713) was a Romanian Greek-Catholic bishop of Alba Iulia between 1698 and 1713. He was the successor to Teophilus Seremi in the seat of Mitropoliei Bălgradului (Alba-Iulia). Through his continued efforts, he perfected the union of the Romanian Transylvanians with the Catholic Church.

Life 
He was born in Bobâlna, the son of an Orthodox priest from Rapoltu Mare (today in Hunedoara County) who was a nobleman of Ciugud.

Anghel was ordained bishop on 22 January 1698, by Eastern Orthodox Metropolitan Teodosius (1620–1708), Primate of the Metropolitan diocese of Ungro-Wallachia and by Patriarch of Jerusalem Dositheos II (1641–1707), who was in exile.

Patriarch Dositheos II also asked Bishop Atanasie Anghel to listen to both the Greek hierarchs from the court of voivode Constantin Brâncoveanu, who supervised the work of the Romanian hierarchs and the Transylvanian Calvinist hierarchy.

First synod of Alba Iulia 

On 7 October 1698 he convened the "Union Synod" in Alba Iulia. The Act of Union with the Catholic Church was signed not only by Anghel, but by all members of the Synod (38 district protopopes and 2270 priests), and sealed with the seal of the Metropolitan Archbishopric of Alba Iulia (Mitropolia Bălgradului in old Romanian language). The Transylvanian Diet, controlled by Protestants, did not look favorably upon the confessional issues of the Romanian people. Large land holders began to persecute the new Romanian Greek-Catholic priests, a situation which Atanasie Anghel had to cope with. Protestant noblemen encouraged revolts among peasants opposed to joining the Catholic Church.

Under these circumstances, the bishop Atanasie Anghel convened a new synod, also held at Alba-Iulia on 4 September 1700. This was attended not only by protopopes and priests, but also by three laymen delegates from each Romanian village. The 54 protopopes, together with the priests and all the delegations present, signed a new act which reinforced the decision of the synod of 1698, reaffirming religious unification of Romanians in Transylvania with the Catholic Church.

For Greek-Catholic bishop Atanasie Anghel, there followed years of hardship, being attacked by Calvinists and also by the Orthodox Archdiocese of Bucharest. Atanasie was summoned to Vienna to give explanations. Under these circumstances, on 7 April 1701 he made a statement that he no longer recognized the Archbishop of Bucharest as his superior.

Business activities
Metropolitan Athanasius was accused several times of carrying out commercial activities. Fifteen years before joining Rome he bought a house in Alba Iulia where he brewed beer and wine. In 1703, after the union with Rome, he was summoned to cease this activity, considered incompatible with the status of bishop. In 1711, he still earned income from beer production.

Death
Anghel died in Alba Iulia on 19 August 1713, and was buried near the old church of the Bălgrad Metropolitanate (built by the ruler Michael the Brave). Subsequently, with the construction of the Alba Carolina Citadel, the old church was demolished, and the tomb of Atanasie was moved to the cemetery near the Holy Trinity Church in Alba Iulia.

In 2013, the remains of Atanasie Anghel were moved to the Cathedral of the Holy Trinity, Blaj.

Literature

 Octavian Bârlea: "Atanasie, Anghel Popa", in Biographical Encyclopedia on the History of Southeastern Europe. Bd. 1 Munich 1974, pp. 106–108.
 Roman Catholic, Transylvanian, Protestant and Israeli religious archontology. Compiled by György Jakubinyi. Rev. 3 and Exp. edition. Cluj: Verbum. 2010. 58–68. He. .

Notes

External links
 http://www.catholic-hierarchy.org/bishop/bpopa.html
 Biserica Română Unită - două sute cincizeci de ani de istorie, Madrid, 1952.
 Atanasie Anghel auf der Homepage der Rumänischen Griechisch-katholischen Kirche 

1713 deaths
Converts to Eastern Catholicism from Eastern Orthodoxy
Former Romanian Orthodox Christians
People from Hunedoara County
Primates of the Romanian Greek Catholic Church
Year of birth unknown
17th-century Eastern Catholic bishops
17th-century Romanian people
18th-century Eastern Catholic bishops
18th-century Romanian people
Romanian Eastern Catholics